The 21st Mounted Brigade previously known as the 2/1st Western Mounted Brigade was a 2nd Line yeomanry brigade of the British Army during the First World War.  In July 1916 it was converted to a cyclist formation as 14th Cyclist Brigade and in October 1916 was redesignated as 10th Cyclist Brigade.  It was still in existence, in Ireland, at the end of the war.

Mounted Brigade
In accordance with the Territorial and Reserve Forces Act 1907 (7 Edw.7, c.9) which brought the Territorial Force into being, the TF was intended to be a home defence force for service during wartime and members could not be compelled to serve outside the country. However, on the outbreak of war on 4 August 1914, many members volunteered for Imperial Service.  Therefore, TF units were split in August and September 1914 into 1st Line (liable for overseas service) and 2nd Line (home service for those unable or unwilling to serve overseas) units.  Later, a 3rd Line was formed to act as a reserve, providing trained replacements for the 1st and 2nd Line regiments.  Similarly, by 1915 most 2nd Line yeomanry regiments were formed into 2nd Line mounted brigades with the same title and composition as the pre-war 1st Line formations.  Two other 2nd Line brigades (2/1st Southern Mounted Brigade and 2/1st Western Mounted Brigade) without 1st Line antecedents were also formed.

The 2/1st Western Mounted Brigade was formed by July 1915, possibly by the redesignation of the Yorkshire Mounted Brigade.  It had under command the 2/1st Duke of Lancaster's Own Yeomanry, the 2/1st Westmorland and Cumberland Yeomanry and the 2/1st Lancashire Hussars.  By March 1916, the brigade was at Cupar, Fife.  On 31 March 1916, the remaining Mounted Brigades were ordered to be numbered in a single sequence and the brigade became 21st Mounted Brigade, still at Cupar under Scottish Command.

In May 1916, 2/B Battery, Honourable Artillery Company (four Ordnance BLC 15-pounders) moved to Cupar where it joined the brigade.

Cyclist Brigade
In July 1916 there was a major reorganization of 2nd Line yeomanry units in the United Kingdom.  All but 12 regiments were converted to cyclists and as a consequence the brigade was converted to 14th Cyclist Brigade.  Further reorganization in October and November 1916 saw the brigade redesignated as 10th Cyclist Brigade in October 1916, still at Cupar.

2/B Battery, HAC left on 10 May 1917 and proceeded to Heytesbury, Wiltshire where it joined the reformed CXXVI Brigade, RFA.  2/1st Lancashire Hussars moved to St Andrews in July 1917.

By January 1918, 10th Cyclist Brigade had moved to Lincolnshire with the 2/1st Duke of Lancaster's at Alford and Skegness, the 2/1st Westmoreland and Cumberland at Spilsby and Burgh-le-Marsh, and the 2/1st Lancashire Hussars also at Skegness.

About May 1918 the Brigade moved to Ireland.  2/1st Duke of Lancaster's was stationed at Tralee, County Kerry, the 2/1st Westmoreland and Cumberland at Buttevant and Charleville, County Cork, and the 2/1st Lancashire Hussars at Bandon and Buttevant, County Cork.  There were no further changes before the end of the war.

See also

 British yeomanry during the First World War
 Second line yeomanry regiments of the British Army

Notes

References

Bibliography
 
 
 
 

Cyclist units and formations of the British Army
Mounted Brigades of the British Army
Military units and formations disestablished in 1915
Military units and formations disestablished in 1918